Steve Haley is an American singer, guitarist and songwriter from Philadelphia, Pennsylvania, United States. He currently sings and plays lead guitar with Richie Ramone from The Ramones. He is also a founding member of the trash/punk band Trashlight Vision which he formed with Acey Slade, (Murderdolls, Joan Jett & the Blackhearts). Haley was also the founding member, lead vocalist and guitarist in the punk rock band Nympho Clepto. He has toured and shared the stage with international acts such as The New York Dolls, Nazareth, Michael Graves from The Misfits and punk rock legends The Buzzcocks.

After signing with Toil Records in 2011, his first solo release Haley was awarded ‘Band of the Year’ by syndicated satellite radio station, Faction, and acquired critical acclaim for their debut album in the UK's rock magazine, Rock Sound. Haley later formed the band Nympho Geist, and recorded their album with Richard Gavalis (producer of The Bloodhound Gang, Chris Deburgh) at Dome Studios in Royersford, Pennsylvania in 2015.

Discography
Love American Style "Undo" Oxygen Records (1997)
Trashlight Vision EP - (2004)
Trashlight Vision EP Allergic To Home - (2005)
Trashlight Vision Rat-Pak Unleashed Compilation (2005)
Trashlight Vision  Prom Queen Massacre Compilation Horror High Records (2006)
Trashlight Vision "Alibis and Ammunition" Sony Music Entertainment's Free-Will label (2006)
Haley (2008)

References

External links
 Official website

Living people
Guitarists from Philadelphia
Year of birth missing (living people)